Technic or Technics may refer to:

 Technics (brand), a brand name of the Panasonic Corporation
 Technics (law), a legal concept
 Engineering
 Lego Technic, toy
 An anglicization (with subtle variation) of the Ancient Greek term techne, used primarily in media theory

See also
 Technical (disambiguation)
 Technology